Grosvenor Place is a commercial office tower in George Street, Sydney, Australia, which was designed by renowned architect Harry Seidler. The building provides office space on the south-eastern edge of the city centre suburb of The Rocks, adjacent to the northern limits of Sydney's CBD; it is 180 metres tall and contains 44 floors. Current tenants include Deloitte, Colliers and Lendi. Grosvenor Place is owned by Blackstone Property and Arcadia.

Description

The building occupies an entire block in Sydney's city centre suburb of the Rocks, bounded by George Street, Essex Street and Grosvenor Street (after which the building is named). As well as the modernist office tower facing George Street, the complex includes the Johnsons Building and Royal Naval House – two low-set heritage buildings in Grosvenor Street. There is a diagonal path for pedestrians, which runs between the heritage buildings and the main tower.

The premium grade office tower was designed by Harry Seidler & Associates. In 1989, Grosvenor Place won the RAIA Lustig & Moar National Prize and the 1991 Sulman Award.

Grosvenor Place was instigated by Bob Hammond who stipulated that the building must generate long term value. This mandate was realised through the design of a large, open floor design, incorporating column-free floor plates, which at 2,000 sqm are among Sydney's largest. This allows whole organisations to occupy complete levels and provides an uninterrupted space that can be custom designed by tenants.

Design
The form of the tower features two crescents with an elliptical central core. The positioning and orientation of Grosvenor Place's two quadrants was chosen to maximise views over Sydney Harbour, Sydney Harbour Bridge and Sydney Opera House down George Street.

Structurally the building consists of a concrete core with steel beams and prefabricated granite facades. Each floor contains 2,000 m2 of space, providing a total floor area of 90,000 m2.

Grosvenor Place's lobby contains Pillars & Cones, an artwork by American minimalist, Frank Stella. The building also houses a four-level basement carpark, al-fresco and internal restaurants and bars.

See also

Buildings and architecture of Sydney
List of tallest buildings in Sydney

References

Office buildings completed in 1988
Harry Seidler buildings
Skyscrapers in Sydney
Office buildings in Sydney
1988 establishments in Australia
Skyscraper office buildings in Australia
George Street, Sydney
Grosvenor Street, Sydney